Irina is a town and commune in Madagascar. It belongs to the district of Ihosy, which is a part of Ihorombe Region. The population of the commune was estimated to be approximately 5,000 in 2001 commune census.

Only primary schooling is available. The majority 66.6% of the population of the commune are farmers, while an additional 33.3% receives their livelihood from raising livestock. The most important crop is rice, while other important products are cassava, tobacco and tomato. Services provide employment for 0.1% of the population.

References and notes 

Populated places in Ihorombe